George O'Brien (April 19, 1899 – September 4, 1985) was an American actor, popular during the silent film era and into the sound film era of the 1930s, best known today as the lead actor in F. W. Murnau's 1927 film Sunrise: A Song of Two Humans.

Early life 
Born in San Francisco, California, George O'Brien was the oldest son of Daniel J. and Margaret L. (née Donahue) O'Brien; O'Brien's father later became the chief of police for the City of San Francisco. (Dan O'Brien ordered the arrest of Roscoe "Fatty" Arbuckle in September 1921 at the scandalous Labor Day party held by Arbuckle.)

In 1917, O'Brien enlisted in the United States Navy to fight in World War I, serving on a submarine chaser. He volunteered to act as a stretcher bearer for wounded Marines and was decorated for bravery. After the war, O'Brien became Light Heavyweight boxing champion of the Pacific Fleet.

Career 

O'Brien came to Hollywood in his early 20s, hoping to become a cameraman, and he worked as an assistant cameraman for both Tom Mix and Buck Jones.  He began his acting career in bit parts and as a stuntman. One of his early roles was in the 1922 George Melford-directed drama Moran of the Lady Letty, most notable for starring Rudolph Valentino. In 1924, O'Brien received his first starring role in the drama The Man Who Came Back with the English actress Dorothy Mackaill. The same year, he was chosen by  John Ford to star in The Iron Horse with actress Madge Bellamy. The film was an immense success at the box office, and O'Brien made nine more films for Ford. In 1927, he starred in the F. W. Murnau-directed Sunrise: A Song of Two Humans with Janet Gaynor, which won three major Academy Awards and remains his most famous film, and he played the lead in the epic East Side, West Side.

O'Brien spent the remainder of the 1920s as an extremely popular leading man in films, often starring in action and adventure roles with popular actresses of the era, such as Alma Rubens, Anita Stewart, Dolores Costello, Madge Bellamy, Olive Borden (with whom he was linked romantically during the 1920s), and Janet Gaynor. With the advent of sound, O'Brien displayed a strong, confident voice and remained a leading star of westerns and outdoor adventures. In 1938, he signed with RKO Radio Pictures to headline a western series; O'Brien (often atop his horse Mike) was well received and was ranked consistently among the top 10 cowboy stars. During this series of westerns, he starred with Actress Virginia Vale on six occasions and with Actor Chill Wills five times. The RKO series was stopped at 17 movies when O'Brien re-enlisted in the Navy; he was replaced by RKO with Tim Holt who had a longer association with RKO than O'Brien.

Military service 
During World War II, O'Brien served as a beachmaster in the Pacific, and was decorated several times. He left service with the rank of commander. He later joined the United States Naval Reserve and retired with the rank of captain in 1962, having four times been recommended for the rank of admiral. 

Following his service in World War II, O'Brien occasionally took featured parts in films directed by John Ford, including Fort Apache, She Wore a Yellow Ribbon, and Cheyenne Autumn. O'Brien's last leading role was in the 1951 movie Gold Raiders, with O'Brien's handling the action and the Three Stooges' (Shemp Howard, Larry Fine, and Moe Howard) doing comedy routines.

While serving in the Naval Reserve, O'Brien took on a project for the Department of Defense as part of President Eisenhower's "People to People" program. He was project officer for a series of orientation films on three Asian countries. One of these films, on Korea, was directed by John Ford. The other two countries covered were Formosa (Taiwan) and the Philippines.

Personal life 
In the 1920s, O'Brien dated actress Olive Borden for many years, and most thought they would marry. For some reason (some say his family did not approve of Olive), they ended their relationship and he eventually married actress Marguerite Churchill on July 15, 1933. Their first child, Brian, died 10 days after his birth. Daughter Orin O'Brien became a double bassist for the New York Philharmonic. Their youngest child Darcy O'Brien was a successful writer and college professor. George and Marguerite divorced in 1948.

Later years and death 
O'Brien suffered a stroke in 1981 and was bedridden the last four years of his life. He died in 1985 in Broken Arrow, Oklahoma. For his contribution to the movie industry, Brien was awarded a star on the Hollywood Walk of Fame at 6201 Hollywood Blvd. in Los Angeles.

Partial filmography

Awards

References

External links 

 
 Photographs of George O'Brien

1899 births
1985 deaths
American male film actors
United States Navy personnel of World War I
United States Navy personnel of World War II
American male silent film actors
Male actors from San Francisco
United States Navy sailors
United States Navy officers
RKO Pictures contract players
Male Western (genre) film actors
20th-century American male actors
1906 San Francisco earthquake survivors
Military personnel from California